Nicholson Road is a major north-south road in the southeastern suburbs of Perth, Western Australia, connecting Albany Highway in Cannington with the large residential areas of Thornlie and Canning Vale, before leaving the Perth urban area and terminating in Oakford. 

Nicholson Road is allocated State Route 31.

History
Until the construction of Kwinana Freeway to Thomas Road in 1993, Nicholson Road was one of southern Perth's most important routes.

Nicholson Road formerly crossed the Kwinana freight railway at a level crossing. Construction of a six-lane road bridge over the rail line to replace the crossing began in May 2017 and was completed in March 2018.

Major intersections
All intersections below are at-grade except for the intersections with Roe Highway and Armadale Road, which are grade-separated interchanges in favour of those two roads over Nicholson Road.

See also

References

External links

Roads in Perth, Western Australia
Cannington, Western Australia